Proverbs 9 is the ninth chapter of the Book of Proverbs in the Hebrew Bible or the Old Testament of the Christian Bible. The book is a compilation of several wisdom literature collections, with the heading in 1:1 may be intended to regard Solomon as the traditional author of the whole book, but the dates of the individual collections are difficult to determine, and the book probably obtained its final shape in the post-exilic period. This chapter is a part of the first collection of the book.

Text
The original text is written in Hebrew language. This chapter is divided into 18 verses.

Textual witnesses
Some early manuscripts containing the text of this chapter in Hebrew are of the Masoretic Text, which includes the Aleppo Codex (10th century), and Codex Leningradensis (1008). Fragments containing parts of this chapter in Hebrew were found among the Dead Sea Scrolls including 4Q103a (4QProv; 30 BCE – 30 CE) with extant verses 16–17.

There is also a translation into Koine Greek known as the Septuagint, made in the last few centuries BC; some extant ancient manuscripts of this version include Codex Vaticanus (B; B; 4th century), Codex Sinaiticus (S; BHK: S; 4th century), and Codex Alexandrinus (A; A; 5th century).

Analysis
This chapter belongs to a section regarded as the first collection in the book of Proverbs (comprising Proverbs 1–9), known as "Didactic discourses". The Jerusalem Bible describes chapters 1–9 as a prologue of the chapters 10–22:16, the so-called "[actual] proverbs of Solomon", as "the body of the book". 
The chapter concludes the first collection or introduction of the book by presenting the final appeals of both wisdom and folly to the 'siimpletons' or naive people in the contrasting style of rival hostesses inviting people to dine in their respective houses, where 'wisdom offers life with no mention of pleasure', whereas 'folly offers pleasure with no mention of death', with the following structure: 
Appeal to accept wisdom (9:1–12)
the invitation of wisdom (9:1–6)
the description of the responses (9:7–11)
the consequence (9:12)
Appeal to accept folly (9:13–18)
the invitation of folly (9:13–17)
the consequence (9:18)

Appeal to accept Wisdom (9:1–12)
The invitation of Wisdom (verses 3–4) echoes the earlier appeals (cf. Proverbs 1:20–21; 8:1–5). It is addressed to the 'simple' or 'simpletons', that is, the people who need the most to dine with Wisdom but who can be most easily enticed to dine with Folly (cf. Proverbs 1:4). Food and drink (verse 5) figuratively describe Wisdom's instruction (cf. Isaiah 55:1–3; Sirach 15:3; 24:19–21).

Verse 1
Wisdom has built her house,
she has hewn out her seven pillars;
"Seven pillars": may refer to 'the habitable world' (cf. Proverbs 8:31; the equation of the house and the world in Proverbs 8:29; Job 38:6; Psalm 104:5). "Seven" is regarded as 'a number for completeness and sacredness', giving the idea that wisdom produces a perfect world.

Verse 3
She has sent out her maidens,
She cries out from the highest places of the city.
Benson says personified Wisdom may be compared to "a great princess": therefore "it was fit she should be attended on by maidens".

Appeal to accept Folly (9:13–18)
Folly is portrayed in terms of the 'seductress', described as 'woman of foolishness' (verse 13). The brash manner in which Folly invites the simple to her house (verses 13–16) recalls the solicitations of the seductress (Proverbs 7:11–12) and contrasts with the formality and decorum of Wisdom's invitation.. Whereas the banquet of Wisdom promotes and celebrates life (verse 6), to dine with Folly is to banquet with the 'dead' in Sheol (cf Proverbs 2:18–19; 5: 5–6; 7:27).

Verse 13
A foolish woman is clamorous;
she is simple, and knows nothing.
Like Wisdom in the previous chapter, Folly is also personified as a character, called "Dame Folly" in the Jerusalem Bible, "the woman called Folly" in the New English Translation.
In different languages, this verse is rendered as follows:
The Hebrew Masoretic Text reads "The foolish woman is boisterous, simplicity, and knows not what." and the Targum translates it, “a foolish woman and a gadabout, ignorant, and she knows not good.” 
The Greek Septuagint reads "A foolish and impudent woman comes to lack a morsel, she who knows not shame." 
The Syriac version has "a woman lacking in discretion, seductive"
The Latin Vulgate has, "a woman foolish and noisy, and full of wiles, and knowing nothing at all."
"Clamorous": or "boisterous" or close to “riotous”.
"Simple" or "full of simpleness", from a Hebrew noun meaning “foolishness”.

See also

Related Bible parts: Proverbs 1, Proverbs 2, Proverbs 7, Proverbs 8

References

Sources

External links
 Jewish translations:
 Mishlei - Proverbs - Chapter 9 (Judaica Press) translation [with Rashi's commentary] at Chabad.org
 Christian translations:
 Online Bible at GospelHall.org (ESV, KJV, Darby, American Standard Version, Bible in Basic English)
 Book of Proverbs Chapter 9 King James Version
  Various versions

09